Gibbons P.C. is a large U.S. law firm with 200 lawyers in offices across four states including in New York, Philadelphia and Newark.

The firm is best known for its litigation department, which included retired judge John Gibbons. The department tackles litigation disputes in areas including commercial, environmental, health care law, and white collar crime.

History
The firm was founded in 1926 by Andrew Crummy, a World War I veteran who attended New York University and Harvard Law School.  After working as an IRS agent he formed a law partnership which was originally called Crummy & Rossbach.  John Joseph Gibbons, for whom the firm is currently named, originally joined the firm in 1950, and stayed until 1969 when he was appointed to the United States Court of Appeals for the Third Circuit.  Gibbons returned to the firm in 1990, at which point the firm was called Gibbons, Del Deo, Dolan, Griffinger & Vecchione. 
The firm opened its New York office in 1997 and grew to more than 40 lawyers through the acquisition of experienced New York attorneys. In 2002, the firm relocated its New York office to One Pennsylvania Plaza to accommodate its growth and future expansion. It occupies the 37th floor of the One Penn Plaza.

Recognition
In 2016, Gibbons was ranked 185th in the AmLaw 200's list of the 200 largest American law firms and 132nd in profit per attorney on the 2016 survey.

In 2016, Gibbons has been recognized as one of 20 law firms on the National Law Journal’s inaugural "Midsize Hot List". Law360 has also highlighted the firm’s multidisciplinary litigation strength, and its contributions to several high-profile corporate transactions in the public and private sectors, in its “Regional Powerhouse” series. The firm has been ranked one of the top 50 firms nationwide for working women by Working Mother magazine and among the top 100 for diversity by MultiCultural Law magazine in 2013.

Notable Lawyers & Alumni
 John Joseph Gibbons, former judge on the United States Court of Appeals for the Third Circuit  
 James R. Zazzali, former Chief Justice of the Supreme Court of New Jersey.
 Jonathan Hafetz, one of the Guantanamo Bay attorneys, was a Gibbons Fellow before joining the Brennan Center for Justice at New York University School of Law.
 Kevin McNulty, Judge of the United States District Court for the District of New Jersey
 Edwin H. Stern, Acting Justice on the New Jersey Supreme Court (Judge of the Appellate Division, Temporarily Assigned to the Supreme Court).

See also
 List of Harvard Law School alumni
 List of largest United States-based law firms by profits per partner
 White shoe firm
 Corporated law firm

References

External links
 Homepage
 Chambers USA profile
 Profile from LexisNexis Martindale-Hubbell
 Gibbons P.C. Organizational Profile at the National Law Review

Law firms established in 1926
Law firms based in Newark, New Jersey